The Hasanbey Zardabi Natural History Museum is a natural history museum in Baku, Azerbaijan.

The museum bears the name of Hasan bey Zardabi, an Azerbaijani journalist and intellectual, and founder of the first Azeri-language newspaper Akinchi ("The Ploughman") in 1875.

The museum has two departments: a geology department that has samples of metallic and nonmetallic natural resources and minerals and rocks of Azerbaijan and a zoology department. The general collection of the museum numbers more than 1400 different items. The biological department exhibits numerous skeletons and fragments of animal bones found during field work and treated by researchers. The oldest exhibit is the teeth of an ichthyosaur from the Cretaceous period, more than 120 million years old.

The research activities of the Natural History Museum have developed in several directions, focused especially on paleontological sites. The main research focuses on the study of the Binagadi quaternary and the Eldar late Sarmatian hipparion faunas, Pirekishkuli Maykop vertebrate fauna, numerous sites of primitive people, as well as Azokh cave and others. In the collection of the quaternary fauna of Binagadi, there are 41 species of mammals, 110 species of birds, 2 reptiles, 1 amphibian, 107 insects and 22 species of plants. Among those are near-complete fossilized skeletons of horses, deer, gazelles and saigas that don't live in the territory of Azerbaijan anymore. 

The Eldar fauna consists of 23 representatives of various forms of vertebrate animals. In addition, the museum also has two types of hipparions (mammals of the horse family), the Sarmatian whale and the lower jaw of a mastodon.

The museum also exhibits the upper jaw, teeth and tusks of the southern elephant which lived in our country 600000 years ago and was discovered in Mingachevir in 2001. 

The museum operates under the auspices of the Institute of Geology and Geophysics of Azerbaijan.

References

Museums with year of establishment missing
Museums in Baku
Natural history museums
Geology museums
Zoology museums